Charles Orlando Ferrante (born September 24, 1932) is a former American football player and Disney Imagineer. He played at the University of Southern California and served two years in the U.S. Navy before playing two seasons with the Los Angeles Chargers.

In 1962 he joined Walt Disney Imagineering, where he worked on the 1964 New York World's Fair, contributed to the design of Disneyland Paris, and helped launch the second Disney Cruise Line in Venice, eventually becoming the company's vice president of engineering, design and production. In 2002 he retired after 40 years with Disney.

References

1932 births
Living people
American football guards
USC Trojans football players
Los Angeles Chargers players
San Diego Chargers players
Players of American football from Los Angeles
American Football League players
Disney people